Katie Sheldon (born 23 December 2003) is an Irish female professional darts player who currently plays in the World Darts Federation (WDF) and Professional Darts Corporation (PDC) events. Her biggest achievement to date was qualifying for inaugural 2022 Women's World Matchplay.

Career
Sheldon started playing darts in 2010, at the age of 7. In 2018 she won two World Darts Federation tournaments for girls, namely, the World Masters where she beat Sophie McKinlay by 4–3 in the final in deciding leg, and the German Open where she beat Christina Schuler in the final. In October 2019, it was announced that Sheldon had entered into a Target partnership.

Great results in the 2022 PDC Women's Series tournaments allowed her to qualify for the inaugural 2022 Women's World Matchplay. This was also her first senior major tournament. In the quarter-finals she faced Fallon Sherrock. Sheldon played a good match, surpassing her rival in some moments, and had the chance to go 3–1 up. Sheldon was close to finishing the fourth leg with 107, but missed the double, giving her opponent a chance at 2–2. In the end, she lost 2–4 to Sherrock.

At the end of September 2022, she was selected by the national federation to participate in the 2022 WDF Europe Cup. On the second day of the tournament, she advanced to the fifth round of the singles competition, where she lost to Lorraine Winstanley by 0–4 in legs. On the third day, she advanced to the quarter-finals of the pairs competition, where she played together with Robyn Byrne. They lost to Lerena Rietbergen and Anca Zijlstra from Netherlands by 1–4 in legs. In the team tournament, she was eliminated in the quarter-finals. Ultimately, despite her good performance, she did not win a medal.

Along with qualifying for 2022 Women's World Matchplay, she was invited to participate in the 2022 PDC World Youth Championship. In the group stage she faced Jaein Oh and Jim Moston. She lost both games and was eliminated from the tournament.

Performance timeline

References

Living people
2003 births
British Darts Organisation players
Irish darts players
Professional Darts Corporation women's players